Clusiella is a plant genus of the family Calophyllaceae. When Planchon and Triana first published it in 1860, based on Clusiella elegans, the genus was considered monotypic and remained as such for about 100 years.

This genus is confined to the Neotropics, occurring in Costa Rica, Panama, Colombia, Venezuela, Ecuador, northern Peru, and northern Brazil.

Taxonomy
The genus Astrotheca Vesque, as well as its orthographic variant Asthotheca Miers ex Planch. & Triana, was brought to synonymy with Clusiella.

Selected species
 Clusiella albiflora Cuatrec. 
 Clusiella amplexicaulis Cuatrec. 
 Clusiella axillaris (Engl.) Cuatrec. 
 Clusiella cordifolia Cuatrec. 
 Clusiella elegans Planch. & Triana 
 Clusiella impressinervis Hammel 
 Clusiella isthmensis Hammel 
 Clusiella macropetala Cuatrec. 
 Clusiella pendula Cuatrec.

References

Calophyllaceae
Malpighiales genera